The 2021 Pac-12 Conference football season was the 43rd season of Pac-12 football taking place during the 2021 NCAA Division I FBS football season. The season began on August 28, 2021, and ended with the 2021 Pac-12 Championship Game on December 3, 2021, at Allegiant Stadium in Paradise, Nevada.

The Pac-12 is a Power Five Conference under the College Football Playoff format along with the Atlantic Coast Conference, the Big 12 Conference, Big Ten Conference, and the Southeastern Conference. The 2021 season is the eleventh for the twelve Pac-12 teams to be divided into two divisions of six teams each, named North and South.

Previous season
The Oregon Ducks defeated USC Trojans 31–24 in the Pac-12 Football Championship Game.

Seven teams qualified to participated in bowl games, but due to the COVID-19 pandemic only two teams; Oregon & Colorado competed finishing with a record of 0–2.

Colorado lost to Texas in the Alamo Bowl, 23–55. Oregon lost to Iowa State in the Fiesta Bowl Game, 17–34.

Preseason
2021 Pac-12 Spring Football and number of signees on signing day:

North Division
California – 21
Oregon – 23
Oregon State – 15
Stanford – 17
Washington – 16
Washington State – 23

South Division  
Arizona – 26
Arizona State – 17
Colorado – 19
UCLA – 17
USC – 26
Utah – 22

Recruiting classes

Pac-12 Media Days
The Pac-12 conducted its 2021 Pac-12 media days at the Loews Hollywood Hotel, in Hollywood, California, on July 27, 2021 (Pac-12 Network).

The teams and representatives in respective order were as follows:

 Pac-12 Commissioner – George Kliavkoff
 Arizona – Jedd Fisch (HC), Stanley Berryhill (WR), Anthony Pandy (LB)
 Arizona State – Herm Edwards (HC), Jayden Daniels (QB), Chase Lucas (DB)
 California – Justin Wilcox (HC), Chase Garbers (QB), Kuony Deng (LB)
 Colorado – Karl Dorrell (HC), Dimitri Stanley (WR), Nate Landman (LB)
 Oregon – Mario Cristobal (HC), Alex Forsyth (OL), Kayvon Thibodeaux (DE)
 Oregon State – Jonathan Smith (HC), Avery Roberts (LB), Jaydon Grant (DB)
 Stanford – David Shaw (HC), MIchael Wilson (WR), Thomas Booker (DE)
 UCLA – Chip Kelly (HC), Dorian Thompson-Robinson (QB), Qwuantrezz Knight (DB)
 USC – Clay Helton (HC), Kedon Slovis (QB), Drake London (WR)
 Utah – Kyle Whittingham (HC), Britain Covey (WR), Devin Lloyd (LB)
 Washington – Jimmy Lake (HC), Jaxson Kirkland (OL), Trent McDuffie (DB)
 Washington State – Nick Rolovich (HC)†, Max Borghi (RB), Jahad Woods (LB)
† Washington State Head Coach Nick Rolovich did not attend the conference, and instead participated remotely

Preseason Media polls
The preseason polls were released on July 27, 2021. Since 1992, the credentialed media has gotten the preseason champion correct just five times. Only nine times has the preseason pick even made it to the Pac-12 title game. Below are the results of the media poll with total points received next to each school and first-place votes in parentheses.  For the 2021 poll, Oregon was voted as the favorite to win both the North Division, as well as the Pac–12 Championship and USC was voted as the favorite to win the South Division.

Preseason awards

All−American Teams

Individual Awards

‡Arizona State's Michael Turk announced his intention to transfer after the media voting window ended.

Preseason All Pac-12

First Team

†California's Michael Saffell announced his medical retirement after the media voting window ended.
‡Arizona State's Michael Turk announced his intention to transfer after the media voting window ended.

Second Team

All Pac–12 Honorable Mention (received votes from four or more members of the media): 
Arizona:
Arizona State: DeaMonte Trayanum (RB)
California: Luc Bequette (DL), Kuony Deng (LB), Cameron Goode (LB), Elijah Hicks (DB), Josh Drayden (DB)
Colorado: Dimitri Stanley (WR), Carson Wells (LB), Isaiah Lewis (DB)
Oregon: Travis Dye (RB), Mycah Pittman (WR), T.J. Bass (OL),
Oregon State: Joshua Gray (OL), Isaac Hodgins DL)
Stanford: Austin Jones (RB), Michael Wilson (WR), Walter Rouse (OL), Kyu Blu Kelly (DB), Ryan Sanborn (P)
UCLA: Dorian Thompson-Robinson (QB), Brittain Brown (RB), Alec Anderson (OL), Sam Marrazzo (OL), Otito Ogbonnia (DL), Caleb Johnson (LB), Qwuantrezz Knight (DB), Quentin Lake (DB), Stephen Blaylock (DB), Nicholas Barr-Mira (PK)
USC: K.D. Nixon (WR), Andrew Vorhees (OL), Parker Lewis (PK), Damon Johnson (AP/RS)
Utah: Brant Kuithe (TE), Viane Moala (DL), JaTravis Broughton (DB), Clark Phillips III (DB), Keegan Markgraf (AP/RS)
Washington: Luke Wattenberg (OL), Henry Bainivalu (OL), Kyler Gordon (DB), Peyton Henry (PK), Kyler Gordon (AP/RS)
Washington State: Travell Harris (WR), Renard Bell (WR), Liam Ryan (OL), Brennan Jackson (DL), Jahad Woods (LB), Jaylen Watson (DB)

Head coaches

Coaching changes
There was one coaching change before the 2021 season.  On December 12, 2020, Kevin Sumlin was fired from Arizona after three seasons. Jedd Fisch was hired to serve as the new head coach on December 23, 2020.
On September 13, 2021, Clay Helton was fired as head coach of USC. Donte Williams was named interim head coach.  
October 18, 2021 Nick Rolovich was fired as head coach of Washington State.  Jake Dickert was named interim coach.
On November 14, 2021 Jimmy Lake was fired as head coach of Washington.  Bob Gregory was named interim coach.

Washington State removed the interim head coaching tag on November 27, 2021, making Jake Dickert the 34th coach in team history.  On November 29, 2021 Lincoln Riley was hired as the 30th head coach in USC history.  The Washington Huskies hired Kalen DeBoer on November 30, 2021, making DeBoer the 30th coach in team history.  Mario Cristobal accept the coaching vacancy at Miami(FL) on December 6, finishing the season with a 10−3 record.  He finished his career with a 35−13 record.  He was replaced for the Alamo Bowl on interim basis by passing game coordinator and wide receivers Bryan McClendon.

Coaches
Note: All stats current through the completion of the 2020 season

Note: 
Clay Helton was fired from USC on September 13 after a 1−1 start. He finished his tenure with a 46–24 record.
Nick Rolovich was fired from Washington State on October 18 after a 4−3 start. He finished his tenure with a 5–6 record.  
Jimmy Lake was fired from Washington on November 14 after a 4–5 start. He finished his tenure with a 7–6 record.  
Mario Cristobal was hired at Miami (FL) on December 6, finishing the season with a 10−3 record.  He finished his tenure with a 35–13 record.

Rankings

Schedules

All times Pacific time.  Pac-12 teams in bold.

† denotes Homecoming game

Rankings reflect those of the AP poll for that week.

Regular season
The regular season is scheduled to begin on August 28, 2021, and end on December 3, 2021.

Week 0

Week 1

Week 2

Week 3

Week 4

Week 5

Week 6

Week 7

Week 8

Week 9

Week 10

Week 11

Week 12

Week 13

Week 14

 The USC vs Cal football game was rescheduled from November 13 because of Covid-19 issues within the Cal football program.

Pac-12 Championship Game

The Pac-12 Championship Game, the conference's eleventh championship game, will be played on December 3, 2021, at the home stadium of the Las Vegas Raiders at Allegiant Stadium in Paradise, Nevada.  It will feature the teams with the best conference records from each division, the North and the South.  Utah, the South Division winner will play Oregon, the winner of the North Division.

Postseason

Bowl games

For the 2020–2025 bowl cycle, The Pac-12 will have annually seven appearances in the following bowls: Rose Bowl (unless they are selected for playoffs filled by a Pac-12 team if champion is in the playoffs), LA Bowl, Las Vegas Bowl, Alamo Bowl, Holiday Bowl, and Sun Bowl. The Pac-12 teams will go to a New Year's Six bowl if a team finishes higher than the champions of Power Five conferences in the final College Football Playoff rankings. The Pac-12 champion are also eligible for the College Football Playoff if they're among the top four teams in the final CFP ranking.

 

Rankings are from CFP rankings.  All times Pacific Time Zone. Pac-12 teams shown in bold.

Selection of teams
Bowl eligible (6): Arizona State, Oregon, Oregon State, UCLA, Utah, Washington State
Bowl-ineligible (6): Arizona, California, Colorado, Stanford, USC, Washington

Head to head matchups

This table summarizes the head-to-head results between teams in conference play.

Updated with the results of all games through December 3, 2021.

Pac-12 vs Power Five matchups
The following games include Pac-12 teams competing against Power Five conferences teams from the (ACC, Big Ten, Big 12, Notre Dame, BYU and SEC). All rankings are from the AP Poll at the time of the game.

Pac-12 vs Group of Five matchups
The following games include Pac-12 teams competing against teams from the American, C-USA, MAC, Mountain West or Sun Belt.

Pac-12 vs FBS independents matchups
The following games include Pac-12 teams competing against FBS Independents, which includes Army, Liberty, New Mexico State, UConn or UMass.

Pac-12 vs FCS matchups
The Football Championship Subdivision comprises 13 conferences and two independent programs.

Pac-12 records vs Other Conferences
2021–2022 records against non-conference foes:

Regular Season

Post Season

Awards and honors

Player of the week honors

Totals per School

Pac-12 Individual Awards
The following individuals received postseason honors as voted by the Pac-12 Conference football coaches at the end of the season.

All-conference teams
The following players earned All-Pac-12 honors. Any teams showing (_) following their name are indicating the number of All-Pac-12 Conference Honors awarded to that university for 1st team and 2nd team respectively.

First Team

Second Team

Notes:
 RS = Return Specialist
 AP/ST = All-Purpose/Special Teams Player (not a kicker or returner)
 † Two-time first team selection;
 ‡ Three-time first team selection

Honorable mentions
ARIZONA: WR Stanley Berryhill, R-Jr.; K Lucas Havrisik, Sr.; DL Trevon Mason, Sr.; OL Josh McCauley, R-Sr.; LB Anthony Pandy, Sr.
ARIZONA STATE: OL LaDarius Henderson, Jr.; TE Curtis Hodges, Gr.; DB Jack Jones, Gr.; DB Chase Lucas, Gr.; WR Ricky Pearsall, Jr.; DB DeAndre Pierce, Gr.; LB Merlin Robertson, Sr.
CALIFORNIA: AP/ST Nick Alftin, R-Jr.; LB Marqez Bimage, Sr.; OL Matthew Cindric, R-Jr.; OL Ben Coleman, R-So.; QB Chase Garbers, R-Sr.; LB Cameron Goode, R-Sr.; DB Lu-Magia Hearns, III, Fr.; OL McKade Mettauer, Jr.; RS Nikko Remigio, Sr.; DL JH Tevis, R-Jr. 
COLORADO: AP/ST Daniel Arias, Jr.; DB Mekhi Blackmon, Jr.; RB Jarek Broussard, So.; DB Christian Gonzalez, Fr.; OL Kary Kutsch, Sr.; DL Jalen Sami, So.; P Josh Watts, Jr.; LB Carson Wells, Jr.
OREGON: DL Popo Aumave, Jr.; QB Anthony Brown, Sr.; RB Travis Dye, Jr.; OL Ryan Walk, Jr.; DB Mykael Wright, So.
OREGON STATE: DB Alex Austin, R-Fr.; WR Trevon Bradford, R-Sr.; DB Jaydon Grant, R-Jr.; OL Joshua Gray, R-Fr.; K Everett Hayes, So.; OL Nous Keobounnam, R-Sr.; OL Brandon Kipper, R-Jr.; QB Chance Nolan, R-So.; DB Kitan Oladapo, R-So.; TE Teagan Quitoriano, Jr.; DL Keonte Schad, Sr.; LB Omar Speights, So.; DB Rejzohn Wright, Jr.
STANFORD: OL Branson Bragg, Jr.; QB Tanner McKee, So.; OL Drake Nugent, Jr.; TE Benjamin Yurosek, So.
UCLA: RB Brittain Brown, R-Sr.; OL Paul Grattan, Jr., R-Sr.
USC: P Ben Griffiths, R-Jr.; RB Keaontay Ingram, Sr.; LB Kana'i Mauga, Sr.; OL Brett Neilon, R-Sr.; DB Chris Steele, Jr.; OL Andrew Vorhees, R-Sr.
UTAH: S Cole Bishop, Fr.; DB Vonte Davis, Sr.; TE Dalton Kincaid, Sr.;  OL Sataoa Laumea, R-Fr.; LB Nephi Sewell, Jr.
WASHINGTON: WR Terrell Bynum, Jr.; DL Tuli Letuligasenoa, So.; RB Sean McGrew, Sr.; LB Jackson Sirmon, So.; OL Luke Wattenberg, Sr.
WASHINGTON STATE: RB Max Borghi, Sr.; QB Jayden de Laura, So.; DB Daniel Isom, Gr.; DL Brennan Jackson, R-Jr.; DB Armani Marsh, R-Sr., WR De'Zhaun Stribling, Fr.; AP/ST Lincoln Victor, Jr.; DB Jaylen Watson, R-Sr.; LB Jahad Woods, Gr.

All-Americans

Currently, the NCAA compiles consensus all-America teams in the sports of Division I-FBS football and Division I men's basketball using a point system computed from All-America teams named by coaches associations or media sources.  The system consists of three points for a first-team honor, two points for second-team honor, and one point for third-team honor.  Honorable mention and fourth team or lower recognitions are not accorded any points.  College Football All-American consensus teams are compiled by position and the player accumulating the most points at each position is named first team consensus all-American.  Currently, the NCAA recognizes All-Americans selected by the AP, AFCA, FWAA, TSN, and the WCFF to determine Consensus and Unanimous All-Americans. Any player named to the First Team by all five of the NCAA-recognized selectors is deemed a Unanimous All-American.

*AFCA All-America Team (AFCA)
*Walter Camp All-America Team
*AP All-America teams
*Sporting News All-America Team
*Football Writers Association of America All-America Team (FWAA)
*Sports Illustrated All-America Team
*Report All-America Team (BR)
*College Football News All-America Team (CFN)
*ESPN All-America Team
*CBS Sports All-America Team
*Athlon Sports All-America Team (Athlon)
*The Athletic All-America Team
*USA Today All-America Team

All-Academic

National award winners
2021 College Football Award Winners

Home game attendance

Bold – Exceed capacity
†Season High

NFL Draft

The following list includes all Pac-12 players who were selected in the 2022 NFL Draft.

References

 
Pac-12 Conference football season